Composer and pianist Antonietta Gambara Untersteiner (1846 - 27 May 1896) was born in Istanbul, Turkey, but lived in Italy most of her life. 

Untersteiner studied music at the Milan Conservatory from 1874 to 1876 and graduated with a prize. Milan Conservatory director Antonio Bazzini questioned whether to admit female students, but noted in a letter to Conservatory of San Pietro a Majella director Giuseppe Martucci that the only candidate worthy of admission in 1874 was Untersteiner.

Untersteiner's music was published by Casa Ricordi. Her compositions include:

Orchestra 

God and Satan (symphonic poem; also arranged for two pianos)

Piano 

God and Satan (two pianos)

Theatre 

Sul Baltico (On the Baltic)

Vocal 

songs in French and Italian

References 

Italian women composers
19th-century Italian composers
1846 births
1896 deaths
Milan Conservatory alumni